The year 1790 in science and technology involved some significant events.

Astronomy
 Armagh Observatory, founded in Ireland by Richard Robinson, 1st Baron Rokeby, Archbishop of Armagh, begins to function.

Biology
 English ornithologist John Latham publishes his Index Ornithologicus, including a scientific description of the black swan.
 English botanical illustrator James Sowerby begins publication of his English Botany, with text by James E. Smith.
 Goethe publishes- Metamorphosis of Plants

Chemistry
 July 31 – Samuel Hopkins of Vermont is granted a patent for a potash production technique, the first issued under the 1st United States Congress's Patent Act of 1790.
 Publication in Montpellier of Jean-Antoine Chaptal's Élémens de chimie, in which he coins the word nitrogen (nitrogène).
 Adair Crawford, working with William Cruickshank, proposes the existence of the alkaline earth metal located near Strontian in Scotland which will later be isolated at strontium.

Technology
 January 30 – Henry Greathead's Original rescue life-boat is tested on the River Tyne in England.

Awards
 Copley Medal: Not awarded

Births
 February 3 – Gideon Mantell, English paleontologist (died 1852)
 March 12 – John Frederic Daniell, English chemist and physicist (died 1845)
 May 23 – Jules Dumont d'Urville, French explorer (died 1842)
 May 30 – John Herapath, English physicist (died 1868)
 July 1 – George Everest, Welsh surveyor and geographer (died 1866)
 October 25 – Robert Stirling, Scottish inventor (died 1878)
 November 17 – August Ferdinand Möbius, German mathematician (died 1868)
 December 9 – Friederike Lienig, Latvian entomologist (d. 1855) 
 December 19 – William Edward Parry, English Arctic explorer (died 1855)

Deaths
 February 5 – William Cullen, Scottish physician and chemist (born 1710)
 March 22 – Anthony Addington, English physician (born 1713)
 April 17 – Benjamin Franklin, American statesman and polymath, known for his experiments with electricity (born 1706)
 July 17 – Johann II Bernoulli, Swiss mathematician (born 1710)

References

 
18th century in science
1790s in science